Yarukku Sondham is a 1963 Indian Tamil-language film directed by K. V. Srinivasan. The film stars Kalyan Kumar, Devika and Rajasree. It was released on 26 July 1963.

Plot

Cast 
The list was compiled from Thiraikalanjiyam and from the film credits

Male cast
Kalyan Kumar
S. V. Subbaiah
J. P. Chandrababu
R. S. Manohar (Guest)
 P. D. Sambandam
T. S. Muthiah
Socrates Thangaraj
S. K. Karikol Raj

Female cast
Devika
Rajasree
B. S. Saroja
Pushpalatha
Malathi
Manorama
Aruna Devi

Production 
The film was produced by Modern Theatres and was directed by K. V. Srinivasan who also wrote the screenplay. Elangovan wrote the dialogues while the comedy part dialogues were penned by K. Devarajan. C. A. S. Mani was in charge of cinematography while L. Balu did the editing. Processing was done by T. P. Krishnamoorthi. P. S. Narasimhan did the audiography. B. Nagarajan was the art director and Jayaram did the choreography. Y. Sivayya was the stunt master.

Soundtrack 
Music was composed by K. V. Mahadevan while the lyrics were penned by A. Maruthakasi, Villiputhan and Panchu Arunachalam.

References

External links 
 

1960s Tamil-language films
1963 drama films
1963 films
Films directed by K. V. Srinivasan
Films scored by K. V. Mahadevan
Indian drama films